Lady Mary Ramsey (also known as Mary Avery; died 1601) was an English philanthropist. She married the Lord Mayor of London Thomas Ramsey.

Biography 
Mary Dale born to Bristol merchant and sheriff William Dale. Little being known about her early life. She married the pensioner Thomas Avery, formally in the service of Thomas Cromwell, in 1554. Upon his death Mary would swiftly remarry to the Lord Mayor of London Thomas Ramsey, one of the wealthiest men in Elizabethan London.

The couple would undertake a wide range of philanthropic works, in the end totalling some £14,318, mostly around London. The most widely remembered of these projects were there endowments to Christ's Hospital in London and Queen Elizabeth's Hospital in Bristol, in 1583. After Thomas' death in 1590 Mary would continue the charitable effort, conveying her manor at Colne Engaine to Christ's Hospital and supporting them by endowing a set of scholarships at the collage. She also undertook a verity of other charitable including the foundation of Essex grammar schools, the parish aid in London, funding several City companies (including the borough of Bristol) and funds for the relief of wounded soldiers, debtors and destitute university students. 

Ramsey died in November of 1601 and was buried at Christ Church. Her will made several large charitable bequeathments. In an epitaph written after her death she was described as, "A Lady rare, most vertuous, meeke, and milde". Thomas Haywood would portray a fictionalised version of Mary and Thomas Ramsey in his 1605 history play If You Know Not Me, You Know Nobody, Part I.

References

Notes

Citations

Bibliography 

 
 
 
 
 

1540s births
1601 deaths
English philanthropists